The Men's time trial C4 road cycling event at the 2012 Summer Paralympics took place on September 5 at Brands Hatch. Fourteen riders from twelve different nations competed. The race distance was 24 km.

Results

References

Men's road time trial C4